Tibor Gonczol (19 January 1933 – 2 January 2014) was an Australian sports shooter. He competed in the 25 metre pistol event at the 1964 Summer Olympics.

References

1933 births
2014 deaths
Australian male sport shooters
Olympic shooters of Australia
Shooters at the 1964 Summer Olympics
Place of birth missing